Stephen Lewis Jerzak (born May 5, 1992) is an American alternative-pop musician, singer, and songwriter from La Crosse, Wisconsin. Some of his notable singles include "Cute" which gained popularity on social media networks in his early career, and "She Said", a record label release of a song that was done collaboratively with American actress and singer Leighton Meester.

History

2004–07: early career 
Growing up in La Crosse, Wisconsin, Jerzak began playing music as a preteen, teaching himself several instruments in his father's home studio. He joined his first band as lead singer and guitarist at age 12. The band "Under Age" consisted of classmates including his friend and now producer, Joel Tock. At age 14, he wrote and professionally recorded his first full-length album titled "Two Years Broken ", in which he released only a minimal number of physical copies and were mainly sold though his local record shops to his hometown following.

2008–09: EP releases, nationwide touring 
Jerzak joined MySpace in November 2008 at age 16. He started uploading cover versions of songs. He released his debut EP called "The Sky High EP" in January 2009. His second EP, "Peace.Love.Truth" followed in May 2009 with his song "Cute". Later that year, "Smile, Happy Looks Good on You" was released in November and "Snow Looks Good on You" was released in December, with songs including "King" and "Party Girl". By the end of 2009 he had received over 10 million song plays on his MySpace music player. Starting in the summer of 2009, he co-headlined the "Bromance Tour".  On that tour he performed in 23 cities in the United States, including dates in New York, Florida, and Texas. Jerzak participated in three additional tours in 2009, including an opening slot on the "EZBronz Tour" with Breathe Carolina. By the end of 2009, he participated in a total of four tours which he traveled over 22,000 miles and played 70 shows from coast to coast, including his first concert appearance at the Unsilent Night 3 Festival at the Dr. Pepper Star Center in Frisco, Texaa. on December 27, 2009.

2010: record label signing, touring 
At age 17, Jerzak signed to Universal/Republic Records in January 2010. Afterwards, he moved to Los Angeles, California to start writing his first full length album. He began working with the producers DJ Swivel, Mark Maxwell, Matt Squire and John Fields. After the first three months in LA, and with some tracks recorded, he performed at SXSW in March 2010, and continued on "The Class of 2010 Tour" with Stereo Skyline and The Downtown Fiction, which took him from Texas to New York. On May 1, 2010 Jerzak played The Bamboozle music festival in New Jersey just before moving back out to LA to continue writing and tracking songs for his debut album release on a major record label. While finishing up his record, Jerzak was notified that he was slated for a direct support spot on "The Up in the Air Tour" with Mike Posner, a national recording artist, that would begin in September 2010. Other performing acts on the high-profile tour included Far East Movement, 2AM Club, and Bad Rabbits. This was followed by another tour in late 2010 called " The Suddenly Yours Tour" with Allstar Weekend, a band that gained popularity from the Disney Channel television network. He began a tour in August 2010 called "Hot Over Summer". Jerzak's lead off single from his debut album, featuring Leighton Meester "She Said was released on July 13, 2010. This preceded the upcoming release of "Miles and Miles" in 2011. Due to Jerzak's heavy touring schedule and facing the reality that "Miles and Miles" would not be released in 2010, Universal Republic and he agreed to release a full-length album from his current catalog on November 9, 2010 titled "My Uke Has A Crush on You", an album which featured mainly ukulele-based songs.

2011: Miles and Miles album release, warped tour 
Fresh off tour in January 2011, Jerzak began planning "The Peace Out Tour" starting in March with a final performance in Mission, Texas where he performed at the Never Say Never Festival and then again in Houston, Texas at SXSW Festival. Coming off the road in April 2011, Jerzak was confirmed to perform on the Skull Candy Stage on the entire 44 city 2011 Vans Warped Tour, which began on June 24. Ten days prior, on June 14, 2011, Jerzak's album, "Miles and Miles" was released.

2012–2013: Cassadee Pope Tour, Nashville, TN 
In January 2012, Jerzak landed a spot with Cassadee Pope, formerly of Hey Monday on her "Solo Tour" which began in Anaheim, California and ended in Fort Lauderdale, Florida. Other participants on the 21 date tour included Darling Parade and Justin Young. In March 2012, Jerzak moved to Nashville, Tennessee to seek other musical opportunities. While there, he has since written and recorded five EPs with other artist as collaborations. "The Nashville Sessions" w/Jamestown Story was released in August 2012 and "Dance and Drive" w/Romance on a Rocketship was released in September 2012. "Taking on Eternity", a single off the Dance and Drive EP, was featured in Hollister Co. Stores
across the country on the 2013 Spring Playlist. Other EP releases include 3 that were recorded with Dylan Lloyd, "What Could Be Better" released in September 2012, "This is Better" released in January 2013 and "Find A Way There" released in September 2013. Also, Jerzak released his first cover EP titled "Stephen Jerzak Covers, EP – Vol.1 in March 2013.

2022: Mixed Emotion album 
Jerzak released album titled "Mixed Emotion" on February 22, 2022. The album was produced by drummer Joel Tock, who also produced his first two EPs "Sky High" and "Peace. Love. Truth.", and also his ukulele themed album "My Uke Has a Crush on You".

Tours

Discography

Studio albums 
My Uke Has A Crush on You (2010)
Miles and Miles (2011)
Mixed Emotion (2022)

EPs 
The Sky High (2009)
Peace. Love. Truth. (2009)
Smile, Happy Looks Good on You (November 22, 2009)
Snow Looks Good on You (December 5, 2009)
The Nashville Sessions with Jamestown Story (2012)
Dance & Drive with Romance on a Rocketship (2012)
What Could Be Better with Dylan Lloyd (2012)
This Is Better with Dylan Lloyd (2013)
Stephen Jerzak Covers, Vol. 1 (2013)
Find a Way There with Dylan Lloyd (2013)

Singles

Promotional singles

References

External links 
 

1992 births
Living people
People from La Crosse, Wisconsin
Musicians from Wisconsin